Next! is the third studio album by German reggae fusion band Seeed. It was released on 14 October 2005.

Track listing

Credits 
Writing, performance and production credits are adapted from the album liner notes.

Personnel

Seeed 
 Pierre Baigorry  Pete Fox – vocals
 Demba Nabé a.k.a. Ear – vocals
 Frank A. Dellé a.k.a. Eased – vocals
 DJ Luke – disc jockey
 Thorsten Reibold a.k.a. Dubmaster Reibold – keyboard
 Moritz "Mo" Delgado – saxophone
 Jerome "Tchamp" Bugnon – trombone
 Rüdiger Kusserow a.k.a. Rudeboy – guitar
 Tobias Cordes a.k.a. Tobsen Cordes – bass
 Alfi Trowers – percussions
 Sebastian Krajewski a.k.a. Based – drums

Guest musicians 
 CeeLo Green – vocals on "Aufstehn!"
 Lady Saw – vocals on "Please"
 Maya Dela Gwada – vocals on "End of Days"

Additional musicians 
 Grace – vocals on "Schwinger", "Next...!!", "Aufstehn!", "Stand Up", "Ocean's 11", "Goosebumps"
 Miss Platnum – vocals "Next...!!", "Aufstehn!", "Stand Up", "Tight Pants", "Ocean's 11", "Goosebumps"
 Nathalie Dorra – vocals on "Tight Pants"
 Beccy Boo – vocals on "Please"
 Richard Koch – trumpet on "Aufstehn!", "Goosebumps", "Ding"
 Charles Matuschewski – trumpet on "Slowlife"
 Dirk Berger – guitar on "Schwinger", "Next...!!"
 Jan Pelao – guitar on "Aufstehn!"
 Son of Dave – harp on "Next...!!"
 Vagner – berimbau on "End of Days"

Production 
 Based – coproduction of "Schwinger", "She Got Me Twisted", "Light the Sun"
 Vincent von Schlippenbach a.k.a. DJ Illvibe (ex-Seeed) – coproduction of "Schwinger"
 Dubmaster Reibold – coproduction of "Aufstehn!", "Ocean's 11", "She Got Me Twisted", "Light the Sun"
 Dirk Berger – coproduction of "Ocean's 11"
 Olsen Involtini – coproduction of "Tight Pants", "Please", "Ocean's 11", "Goosebumps", "Slowlife", "Light the Sun"; Audio mixing of "Schwinger", "Stand Up", "Tight Pants", "Ocean's 11", "Goosebumps", "Slowlife", "Ding"
 Pierre Baigorry – coproduction of "Goosebumps", "Slowlife"; mixing of "Schwinger", "Tight Pants"
 Sebi Proffessionell – mixing of "Next...!!"
 Axel Niehaus – mixing of "Aufstehn!", "Please", "Light the Sun"
 George Brasch – mixing of "Can't Hold Me", "She Got Me Twisted", "End of Days"
 Sascha Bühren a.k.a. Busy – mastering
 Chris Athens – mastering
 Tom Meyer – sequencing

Artwork and design 
 Jaybo4MONK – artwork

Studios 
 Seeedbase I, Berlin, Germany – production, recording of "Schwinger", "Next...!!", "Aufstehn!", "Stand Up", "Tight Pants", "Ocean's 11", "Can't Hold Me", "Goosebumps", "Slowlife", "Ding", "She Got Me Twisted", "Light the Sun"
 Seeedbase II, Berlin, Germany – production, recording of "Schwinger", "Aufstehn!", "Stand Up", "Ocean's 11", "Goosebumps", "Slowlife", "She Got Me Twisted"
 Seeedbase III, Berlin, Germany – production, recording of "Next...!!", "Please", "Goosebumps", "Ding", "Light the Sun"
 Seeedbase IV, Berlin, Germany – production, recording of "Next...!!", "Please", "Ocean's 11", "Can't Hold Me", "She Got Me Twisted", "Light the Sun", "End of Days"
 Seeedbase V, Berlin, Germany – production, recording of "Can't Hold Me", "Goosebumps", "End of Days"
 Maze Studios, Atlanta – production, recording of "Aufstehn!"
 Pow Pow Studio, Cologne, Germany – production, recording of "Stand Up"
 Boundzoundbase I, Berlin, Germany – production, recording of "Please", "Slowlife", "Light the Sun"
 Boundzoundbase II, Berlin, Germany – production, recording of "Slowlife"
 Transporterraum, Berlin, Germany – production, recording of "Slowlife"
 Quench-Field Studios – mixing of "Schwinger", "Stand Up", "Tight Pants", "Ocean's 11", "Goosebumps", "Slowlife", "Ding"
 Ochsenwerder Sturgeon Studio – mixing of "Next...!!"
 Tritonus Berlin – mixing of "Aufstehn!", "Please", "Light the Sun"
 Gompa Studio – mixing of "Can't Hold Me", "She Got Me Twisted", "End of Days"
 Sterling Sound – mastering
 Master & Servant HH – sequencing

Charts

Weekly charts

Year-end charts

Certifications

References

External links 
 
 Next! at Seeed's official website

2005 albums
Seeed albums
Warner Music Group albums